Jan Evstrat Vithkuqari (ca. 1755-1822) was an Albanian scholar, educator, and translator.

Life 

He was born in Vithkuq, southern Albania possibly in 1755. He studied in the New Academy of Moscopole, where he worked as a teacher. He also worked as a teacher in Arta, Përmet and Ioannina. Apart from Albanian he knew English and Greek.

He wrote a grammar book of the Albanian language and was the co-author of a 2000-word English-Greek-Albanian dictionary included in William Martin Leake's Researches in Greece published in 1814.

Sources 

1750s births
1822 deaths
Albanian scholars
Albanian translators
Albanian schoolteachers
Linguists from Albania
18th-century translators
19th-century translators
People from Korçë County
Eastern Orthodox Christians from Albania